Autodromo Eduardo Prudêncio Cabrera is a  motor racing circuit in Rivera. It was inaugurated on September 1951. However, it was abandoned at the end of the 1990s. In 2012, the circuit was rebuilt again and it was reopened in November 2013. The circuit currently hosts TCR South America Touring Car Championship, TCR Brazil Championship and national championships. However, it also hosted some other Brazilian motorsport championships, such as Fórmula Truck and Copa Truck due to its proximity to the Brazilian border.

Lap records 

The official race lap records at the Autódromo Eduardo Prudêncio Cabrera are listed as:

References

Sports venues in Uruguay
Motorsport venues in Uruguay